In typesetting, the hook or tail is a diacritic mark attached to letters in many alphabets. In shape it looks like a hook and it can be attached below as a descender, on top as an ascender and sometimes to the side. The orientation of the hook can change its meaning: when it is below and curls to the left it can be interpreted as a palatal hook, and  when it curls to the right is called hook tail or tail and can be interpreted as a retroflex hook. It should not be mistaken with the hook above, a diacritical mark used in Vietnamese, or the rhotic hook, used in the International Phonetic Alphabet.

Letter Z with tophook — became letter , .

Letter X with two high hooks — became letter .

Letters with hook
It could be argued that the hook was used to derive the letter J from the letter I, or the letter Eng (ŋ) from the letter N. However, these letters are usually not identified as being formed with the hook.

Most letters with hook are used in the International Phonetic Alphabet, and many languages use them (along with capitals) representing the same sounds.

The hook often attaches to the top part of the letter, curling to the left or to the right, finishing the ascender if present. It may then be referred to as a crook, in some languages like French more commonly than in English that is less successful in mitigating the semantic overload of the hook term.

If the hook attaches to the bottom part of the letter, it is often called a palatal hook if it curls to the left, or a retroflex hook if it curls to the right.

The letter ɿ with right hook does not necessarily mean retroflex (this is not true for ʅ).

Unicode
Unicode has the combining diacritics  and  but these are not recommended to be used with letters, and should be used to illustrate the hooks themselves. Instead Unicode recommends the use of characters that already include the hook.

The  is used to mark an r-colored vowel.

See also
Hook above
Palatal hook
Ogonek

References 

Latin-script diacritics
Cyrillic-script diacritics